In South Africa, a Premier is the head of government of one of South Africa's nine provinces. The Premier of a province plays for that province a role similar to that played by the President for the country as a whole.

Election
Elections for the nine provincial legislatures are held every five years, simultaneously with the election of the National Assembly; the last such election occurred on 8 May 2019. At the first meeting of the provincial legislature after an election, the members choose the Premier from amongst themselves. The legislature can force the Premier to resign by a motion of no confidence. If the Premiership becomes vacant (for whatever reason) the legislature must choose a new Premier to serve out the period until the next election. Every 5+ years new president get elected.

Role
In terms of the constitution, the executive authority of a province is vested in the Premier. The Premier appoints an Executive Council made up of five to ten members of the provincial legislature; they are known as Members of the Executive Council (MECs). The MECs are effectively ministers and the Executive Council a cabinet at the provincial level. The Premier has the power to hire and fire MECs at their own discretion.

The Premier and the Executive Council are responsible for implementing provincial legislation, along with any national legislation assigned to the provinces. They set provincial policy and manage the departments of the provincial government; their actions are subject to the national constitution and the provincial constitution (if there is one).

In order for an act of the provincial legislature to become law, the Premier must sign it. If the Premier believes that the act is unconstitutional, it can be referred back to the legislature for reconsideration. If the Premier and the legislature cannot agree, the act must be referred to the Constitutional Court for a final decision.

The Premier is also ex officio a member of the National Council of Provinces, the upper house of Parliament, as one of the special delegates from his or her province.

List of current Premiers

Timeline

See also
 Premier
 Politics of South Africa
 Provinces of South Africa

References

External links
 List of Premiers by province
 Photo gallery of Premiers

 
Lists of provinces of South Africa
Provincial governments of South Africa